Sylvia Guertin-Riley  was appointed a judge of the Family Division of the Manitoba Court of Queen's Bench on July 27, 1995. Unlike most of her colleagues, she filled a newly created position, instead of replacing another judge.

Guertin-Riley graduated in law from the University of Manitoba Law School in 1980, and was called to the Manitoba Bar in 1981. She then joined the firm of Schwartz, McJannet & Co. and became a partner in 1987. From 1988 until her appointment to the bench, she was a partner with the firm of Riley, Orle, Guertin, Born. She practised mainly civil litigation, family law and labour law.

On September 16, 2006, Guertin-Riley elected to become a supernumerary judge and retired in September 2011.

References
 Government of Canada News Release (accessed August 3, 2007)
 Court of Queen's Bench website (accessed August 3, 2007)

Judges in Manitoba
University of Manitoba alumni
Canadian women judges
Living people
Year of birth missing (living people)